The 2K22 Tunguska is a Soviet and now Russian tracked self-propelled anti-aircraft weapon armed with a surface-to-air gun and missile system. It is designed to provide day and night protection for infantry and tank regiments against low-flying aircraft, helicopters, and cruise missiles in all weather conditions. The NATO reporting name for the missile used by the weapon system is SA-19 "Grison".

Development
Development of the 2K22 anti-aircraft system began on 8 June 1970. At the request of the Soviet Ministry of Defense, the KBP Instrument Design Bureau in Tula, under the guidance of the appointed Chief Designer , started work on a 30mm anti-aircraft system as a replacement for the 23mm ZSU-23-4.

The project, code-named "Tunguska", was undertaken to improve on the observed shortcomings of the ZSU-23-4 (short range and no early warning) and a counter to new ground attack aircraft in development, such as the A-10 Thunderbolt II, which was designed to be highly resistant to 23 mm cannons.

The initial requirements set for the system were to achieve twice the performance in terms of range, altitude and combat effectiveness of the ZSU-23-4, additionally the system should have a reaction time no greater than 10 seconds. Due to the similarities in the fire control of artillery and missiles, it was decided that the Tunguska would be a combined gun and missile system. A combined system is more effective than the ZSU-23-4, engaging targets at long-range with missiles, and shorter range targets with guns.

In addition to KBP as the primary contractor, other members of the Soviet military-industrial complex were involved in the project; the chassis was developed at the Minsk tractor factory, the radio equipment at the Ulyanovsk Mechanical Factory, central computer at NIEMI ("Antey"), guidance and navigational systems by VNII "Signal", and optics were developed by the Leningrad Optical Mechanical Association (LOMO).

However, development was slowed between 1975 and 1977 after the introduction of the 9K33 Osa missile system, which seemed to fill the same requirement but with greater missile performance. After some considerable debate, it was felt that a purely missile-based system would not be as effective at dealing with very low flying attack helicopters attacking at short range with no warning as had been proven so successful in the 1973 Arab-Israeli War. Since the reaction time of a gun system is around 8–10 seconds, compared to approximately 30 seconds for a missile-based system, development was restarted.

The initial designs were completed in 1973, with pilot production completed in 1976 at the Ulyanovsk Mechanical Factory. System testing and trials were conducted between September 1980 and December 1981 on the Donguzskiy range. It was officially accepted into service on 8 September 1982 and the initial version, which was designated 2K22/2S6, had four missiles in the ready to fire position (two on each side) and two 2A38 autocannons. The Tunguska entered into limited service from 1984, when the first batteries were delivered to the army.

After a limited production run of the original 2K22, an improved version designated 2K22M/2S6M entered service in 1990. The 2K22M featured several improvements with eight ready-to-fire missiles (four on each side) as well as modifications to the fire control programs, missiles and the general reliability of the system, and improved autocannons, 2A38M.

Tunguska underwent further improvement when, in 2003, the Russian armed forces accepted the Tunguska-M1 or 2K22M1 into service. The M1 introduced the new 9M311-M1 missile, which made a number of changes allowing the 2K22M1 to engage small targets like cruise missiles by replacing the eight-beam laser proximity fuze with a radio fuse. An additional modification afforded greater resistance to infrared countermeasures by replacing the missile tracking flare with a pulsed IR beacon. Overall, the Tunguska-M1 has a combat efficiency 1.3–1.5 times greater than the Tunguska-M.

Description
The GRAU index lists the "Tunguska" system as 2K22. A complete system or battery consists of six 2S6 combat vehicles armed with the 9M311 "Treugol'nik" (triangle) surface-to-air missile and two 2A38 30 mm cannons. These are accompanied by up to three 2F77 transloader trucks. The 2K22 is also associated with a variety of support facilities including the 2F55, 1R10 and 2V110 repair and maintenance vehicles, the MTO-AGZ workshop and the 9V921 test vehicle and others. These facilities provide maintenance for the 2K22 battery in the field as well as scheduled overhauls.

The 2S6 combat vehicle uses the GM-352 and later GM-352M chassis developed and produced by the Minsk Tractor Plant (MTZ) which has six road wheels with hydropneumatic suspension on each side, a drive sprocket at the rear and three return rollers. An NBC system is also integrated into the chassis, which is armored to protect it from small arms fire. an automatic gear change and diagnostic capability are available with latest Tunguska-M1 which uses the new GM-5975 chassis developed and produced by MMZ. It has an ability of climb hills with up to a 35° slope. Overall, the layout is similar to the previous ZSU-23-4 with a large central 360-degree rotating turret (designated the 2A40) containing the armament, sensors and three of the crew: the commander, gunner and radar operator. The driver sits in the front left of the hull, with a gas turbine APU to his right and the multi-fuel diesel engine in the rear of the hull.

Alongside the 1A26 digital computer and the 1G30 angle measurement system form the 1A27 radar complex. Tunguska-M has the 1RL144M radar with detection range  and tracking range . A C/D-band IFF system is also fitted and designated 1RL138. The radar system is highly protected against various types of interference, and can work if there are mountains on the horizon, regardless of the background. The system is able to fire on the move using 30 mm cannons, although it must be stationary to fire missiles.

Standard equipment of the 2S6 and 2S6M includes a computerized fire control system, heating, ventilation, NBC system, an automatic fire detection and suppression system, navigational equipment, night vision aids, 1V116 intercom, external communications system with an R-173 receiver -modernized in the 2S6M for better communication with the command post- and monitoring equipment. The vehicle also has protection against the effects of nuclear, biological and chemical weapons.

A battery of six Tunguska can automatically receive fire control information via an encrypted radio link, this allows targets to be distributed between individual units from a Ranzhir or PPRU battery command post, which can receive target information from either AWACS or early warning radar or in the case of the PPRU its own radar equipment.

Variants

2K22
Some of these early versions of the "Tunguska" system were known as "Treugol'nik" (Russian Треугольник—triangle). This system is mounted on the 2S6 integrated air defense vehicle.

2K22M (1990)
Main production system, with 9M311M (3M88) missiles and 2A38M autocannons. This integrated air defense vehicle 2S6M is based on the GM-352M chassis. 2F77M transporter-loader. 2F55-1, 1R10-1 and 2V110-1 repair and maintenance vehicles.

2K22M1 (2003)
Improved version with the 2S6M1 combat vehicle on a GM-5975 chassis, using the 9M311-M1 missile and with an improved fire control system. Passed state trials and entered service with the Russian armed forces on 31 July 2003.

Guns
The dual 2  30 mm cannons (as well as the later 2A38M) were designed by the KBP Instrument Design Bureau and manufactured by the Tulamashzavod Joint Stock Company. HE-T and HE-I shells are used and fitted with a A-670 time and impact fuze which includes an arming delay and self destruct mechanism. The 2K22 can fire its cannons in two primary modes of operation, radar and optical. In radar mode, the target tracking is fully automatic, with the guns aimed using data from the radar. In optical mode, the gunner tracks the target through the 1A29 stabilized sight, with the radar providing range data.

Missiles

The second stage has four fixed fins, and four steerable control surfaces.

Guidance is performed by the target tracking radar, it constantly relays target range, elevation and bearing to the fire-control computer, and on the basis of this data the computer generates the laying commands for the guns or the trajectory corrections for the missiles. A back-up tracking method can be used by the gunner, who uses the stabilized sight of the Tunguska to track the target in elevation and azimuth. The gunner is initially cued towards the target by the system's search radar. Once the missile is steered to within  of the target, an active laser or radio fuse (9M311-M1) is triggered. A contact fuse is also fitted.

Missile variants
 9M311: Original missile, laser proximity fuze, range .
 9M311K (3M87): Naval version of the 9M311 used by the Kortik system. Export version of Kashtan uses the 9M311-1E missile.
 9M311-1: Export version of the missile.
 9M311M (3M88): Improved version of the missile.
 9M311-M1: Used with the Tunguska-M1 radar proximity fuse for improved capability against cruise missiles. Pulsed tracking light instead of constant flare for better resistance to infrared countermeasures.

Similar systems
 : 9M311 missiles were first exported to China in 2005, and at the 9th Zhuhai Airshow held in November 2012, a suspected Chinese derivative of 2K22 Tunguska designated as FK-1000 (similar to this system is Sky Dragon 12, SD-12, Tianlong 12 on an 8 wheel chassis, only rockets)  was revealed to public. The China Aerospace Science and Technology Corporation (CASIC) developed FK-1000, differs from 2K22 Tunguska in that FK-1000 is mounted on an 8 × 8 truck, and the 30 mm guns of Tunguska are replaced by 25 mm autocannons. The radars of FK-1000 are arranged in the exactly the same way as in 2K22 Tunguska, but mechanically scanned surveillance and tracking radars of Tunguska are both replaced by a phased array radars in FK-1000. A total of 12 missiles are mounted on the sides of weapons station, with 6 on each side, in the form of 2 rows of 3 containers/launchers each. The missile of FK-1000 is designated as KS-1000, which is also surprisingly similar to 9M311, and this has led many in the west to claim that FK-1000 system is derived from 2K22 Tunguska, but with cheaper price tag than the latest Russian system: in comparison to the 15 million dollars of Pantsir-S1 (SA-22), FK-1000 system is priced at 5 million dollars.

Combat history
Variants of the 2K22 system have continued to serve in the Soviet and later Russian armed forces since their initial introduction in 1984. The 2K22 has also been inducted into the armed forces of a number of foreign states, most notably India. The 2K22 has been used in the 2008 South Ossetia war by Russian armed forces.

Operators

Current operators
 : 2S6
 : 2S6M1 in service in small numbers 
 : 12 2К22М1s as of 2012
 : 38 acquired from Russia between 2004 and 2007, and 3 from Ukraine in 2019
 : more than 250 2К22s as of 2012, according to Military Balance 2012. 21 Tunguska-M1s were delivered in 2012–2017.
 : six 2S6М1s delivered in 2008
 : 70 2S6s as of 2012, according to Military Balance 2012. At least one captured Tunguska-M1 is operational in Ukrainian service. 75 as of 2021.

Former operators
 : Passed on to successor states.

Comparable systems
Pantsir-S1
K30 Biho
HS M09 BOV-3
Air Defense Anti-Tank System
Flugabwehrkanonenpanzer Gepard
PZA Loara
Tor missile system
CS/SA5
PGL-625
Type 87 Self-Propelled Anti-Aircraft Gun
Type 95 SPAAA
LAV-AD (Air Defense)

References

External links

 Tunguska-M1 Air Defense Missile/Gun System, KBP Instrument Design Bureau website
 Federation of American Scientists 
 Warfare.ru SA-19
 Threat Update: 2S6 Tunguska Self-Propelled Air Defense System, Red Thrust Star, April 1995 issue
 YouTube Tunguska-M1 Video
 Tunguska-M1 Walkaround

Self-propelled anti-aircraft weapons of the Soviet Union
Self-propelled anti-aircraft weapons of Russia
Close-in weapon systems
Missile launchers
2K22
KBP Instrument Design Bureau products
Almaz-Antey products
Military vehicles introduced in the 1980s